Puritanical Euphoric Misanthropia is the fifth studio album by Norwegian black metal band Dimmu Borgir. It was released by Nuclear Blast Records in 2001. This is the first album to feature drummer Nicholas Barker, guitarist Galder, and ICS Vortex on bass. It is also the first album upon which the band used real orchestral instrumentation instead of keyboard lines.

A remixed and remastered version of the album was announced for 28 October 2022.

Critical reception 

AllMusic wrote, "A minority of purists might see this as too much of a departure, a complaint that would have more merit if Puritanical Euphoric Misanthropia wasn't as exquisite as it is diverse."

Track listing

Credits

Dimmu Borgir
Shagrath –  lead vocals/harsh vocals, lyrics (5, & 12); synth
Galder – lead guitar
Silenoz – rhythm guitar, lyrics (2-4, & 6-9)
ICS Vortex – bass guitar, co-clean vocals (3, 4, 8, 10, & 13), lyrics (10)
Mustis – synthetics and samples
Nicholas Barker – drums and percussion

Gothenburg Symphony Orchestra (tracks 1-4, 6-8, & 10-11)
 Orchestration arranged and conducted by Gaute Storås
 Annica Kroon, Annika Hjelm, Bertil Lindh, Catherine Claesson, Nicola Boruvka, Per Enokson, Thore Svedlund – violins
 Henrik Edström, Nils Edin, Per Högberg – violas
 Grzegorz Wybraniec, Johan Stern – cellos
 Bo Eklund – double bass

Miscellaneous
Fredrik Nordström – mixing, engineering
Jan Baan – assistant engineer
Alf Børjesson – cover concept, artwork
Thomas Ewerhand – layout
Dee Snider – songwriting on "Burn in Hell"

"Puritania"
Charlie Storm – sample manipulation 
Morten Lunde – co-lyrics

Charts

References

Dimmu Borgir albums
2001 albums
Albums recorded at Studio Fredman
Nuclear Blast albums
Gothic metal albums by Norwegian artists
Albums produced by Fredrik Nordström